Alice Pickering defeated Edith Austin 4–6, 6–3, 6–3 in the All Comers' Final, but the reigning champion Charlotte Cooper defeated Simpson Pickering 6–2, 6–3 in the challenge round to win the ladies' singles tennis title at the 1896 Wimbledon Championships.

Draw

Challenge round

All Comers'

References

External links

Ladies' Singles
Wimbledon Championship by year – Women's singles
Wimbledon Championships - Singles
Wimbledon Championships - Singles